Pol-e Shekasteh (also known as Khosrowābād, Khūshrnābād, Khūsrūābād, and Pol Shekast) is a village in Jolgeh Rural District, in the Central District of Asadabad County, Hamadan Province, Iran. At the 2006 census, its population was 397, in 97 families.

References 

Populated places in Asadabad County